The Gesetzlose Gesellschaft zu Berlin (literally, the 'Berlin Lawless Society' because it had no internal rules) is a social society founded in Berlin in 1809 in the aftermath of the Battle of Jena-Auerstedt to press for the reform of Prussian government and society.

Among its prominent members were Ernst von Pfuel, Ernst Heinrich Toelken, Felix von Bendemann, and Ludwig von Wolzogen.

References

in German
 Die Gesetzlose Gesellschaft zu Berlin. Gegründet am 4. November 1809. Berlin 1959. 148 p.,
 Clemens August Carl Klenze: Philipp Buttmann und die Gesetzlosen am 4./5. Dezember 1934 - eine Handschrift für die Mitglieder der gesetzlosen Gesellschaft; printed at Reimar, 1834, Berlin, also as google book: 
 Andreas Arndt / Wolfgang Virmond: Hegel und die „Gesetzlose Gesellschaft“, in: Hegel-Studien 20 (1985), p.113-116
 Walter Boeckh: Ernst Moritz Arndt und sein Berliner Freundeskreis aus der „Gesetzlosen" und „Griechischen Gesellschaft" in: Zeitschrift des Vereins für die Geschichte Berlins, 54, 1937
 Die Gesetzlose Gesellschaft zu Berlin. Festschrift zum 100jährigen Bestehen. 1809-1909. 
Supplement to Allgemeine Preußische Staatszeitung No. 177,  28. June 1829

External links
 http://www.gesetzlose-gesellschaft.de/index.phtml 

Organisations based in Berlin
Organizations established in 1809
1809 establishments in Prussia
Gentlemen's clubs in Germany
Politics of Prussia